Rufiryo is an administrative ward in the Busokelo District of the Mbeya Region of Tanzania. In 2016 the Tanzania National Bureau of Statistics report there were 7,021 people in the ward, from 6,370 in 2012.

Villages / vitongoji 
The ward has 5 villages and 21 vitongoji.

 Kifunda
 Kifunda
 Landani
 Ndumbati
 Nsanga
 Kikuba
 Bujonde
 Busikali
 Katumba
 Kinela
 Kipangamansi
 Ndubi
 Kipapa
 Katete
 Lupando
 Mpulo
 Ndola
 Sanu
 Kipyola
 Kalengo
 Ntalula
 Sota
 Lusungo
 Landani
 Lusungo
 Njisi

References 

Wards of Mbeya Region